Billboard Dad is a 1998 American direct-to-video comedy film directed by Alan Metter starring Mary-Kate and Ashley Olsen. It was produced by Warner Bros. in collaboration with Dualstar Productions and Tapestry Films (now Screendoor).

Plot
Set in Los Angeles, this film revolves around Emily Tyler, a 12-year-old surfer-girl, and her 12-year-old twin sister, Tess, a member of a high-diving team. The movie follows the two sisters as they try various strategies to get their widower father, Max (who is a talented artist and sculptor), a girlfriend. After their first attempts end in failure, Tess and Emily team up with their friend Cody to paint an advertisement on a giant billboard situated high above Sunset Boulevard. Many women answer the advertisement through letters and through random chance, Max answers a letter submitted by a woman named Debbie. Debbie brings along her friend Brooke as a back-up in preparation for the former's date with Max. Brooke and Max coincidentally meet and take a liking to each other and Debbie agrees they should start dating. At first, Tess and Emily don't like Brooke's son, Ryan, a skater punk boy. But when an elaborate scheme by Max's business manager, Nigel, to break up the romantic relationship between Max and Brooke arises, Ryan and the girls learn to put aside their differences in order to foil the break-up plan.

Cast
 Mary-Kate Olsen as Teresa "Tess" Tyler
 Ashley Olsen as Emily Tyler
 Tom Amandes as Maxwell Tyler
 Jessica Tuck as Brooke Anders
 Carl Banks as Nigel
 Ellen Ratner as Debbie
 Sam Saletta as Ryan
 Rafael Rojas III as Cody
 Troian Bellisario as Kristen Bulut
 Angelique Parry as Julianne
 Bailey Luetgert as Brad Thomas
 Vincent Bowman as Buzz Cut
 Debra Christofferson as Autumn
 Lisa Montgomery as Enola Rubenstein
 Twink Caplan as Chelsea Myers
 Diana Morgan as Katherine Buxbaum
 Teresa Caplan as Woman

Reception
The film was rated "Family-Approved" for all ages from the Dove Foundation.

References

External links
 
 Billboard Dad website
 Review by Scott Weinberg

1998 films
1998 comedy films
1998 direct-to-video films
1990s children's comedy films
American children's comedy films
Direct-to-video comedy films
Films about twin sisters
Films directed by Alan Metter
Films scored by David Michael Frank
Warner Bros. direct-to-video films
Films about father–daughter relationships
Films set in Los Angeles
1990s English-language films
1990s American films